Holme is a neighbourhood in the district of Højbjerg in Aarhus, Denmark. It is located 5km south of the city center.

The Ring 2 ring road pass through Holme. This stretch is known as Ringvej Syd.

Gallery

External links 

Neighborhoods of Aarhus